Mike Buzak (born February 10, 1973 in Edson, Alberta) is a former professional ice hockey goaltender.  He was drafted in the seventh round, 167th overall, of the 1993 NHL Entry Draft by the St. Louis Blues; however, he never played in the National Hockey League.

After playing collegiately at Michigan State University, Buzak played eight seasons of professional hockey in the International Hockey League, American Hockey League, East Coast Hockey League and West Coast Hockey League. In the 1997-98 season, he shared the James Norris Memorial Trophy (fewest goals allowed for the season) with his Long Beach Ice Dogs (IHL) teammate Kay Whitmore.

Awards and honours

References

External links
 

1974 births
Albany River Rats players
Augusta Lynx players
Baton Rouge Kingfish players
Canadian ice hockey goaltenders
Ice hockey people from Alberta
Living people
Long Beach Ice Dogs (IHL) players
Long Beach Ice Dogs (WCHL) players
Michigan State Spartans men's ice hockey players
Milwaukee Admirals (IHL) players
People from Edson, Alberta
Phoenix Mustangs players
St. Louis Blues draft picks
Tucson Gila Monsters players
Utah Grizzlies (IHL) players
Worcester IceCats players
Canadian expatriate ice hockey players in the United States